Rassvet (lit. "first light"), also known as the Mini-Research Module 1 (MRM-1;) and formerly known as the Docking Cargo Module (DCM), is a component of the International Space Station (ISS). The module's design is similar to the Mir Docking Module launched on STS-74 in 1995. Rassvet is primarily used for cargo storage and as a docking port for visiting spacecraft. It was flown to the ISS aboard  on the STS-132 mission on 14 May 2010, and was connected to the ISS on 18 May 2010. The hatch connecting Rassvet with the ISS was first opened on 20 May 2010. On 28 June 2010, the Soyuz TMA-19 spacecraft performed the first docking with the module.

Details 

Rassvet was docked to the nadir port of Zarya with help from the Canadarm2. Rassvet carried externally attached outfitting equipment from NASA for the Nauka Multipurpose Laboratory Module Upgrade (MLM-U), a spare elbow joint for the European Robotic Arm (ERA), an ERA portable workpost used during EVAs, heat radiator, internal hardware and  Naukas experiment airlock for launching cubesats. Delivering Rassvet thus enabled NASA to fulfill its promise to ship 1.4 metric tons to equip the MLM.

Rassvet has two docking units: one to attach to the nadir port of the Zarya module, and one to provide a docking port for a Soyuz or Progress spacecraft. It implements the role of the Docking and Storage Module from the original ISS design. Russia announced the cancellation of the last of the two planned Russian Research Modules when it announced the plans for Rassvet.

Initial planning 
The initial ISS plan included a Docking and Storage Module (DSM). This planned Russian element was intended to provide facilities for stowage and an additional docking port, and would have been launched to the station on a Proton launch vehicle. The DSM would have been mounted to Zaryas nadir (Earth-facing) docking port. It would have been similar in size and shape to the Zarya module.

The DSM was cancelled due to Russian budgetary constraints for some time, but its design was eventually modified into the Docking and Cargo Module (Rassvet) that was to be connected to the same Zarya location to provide storage space and a docking port. During the cancellation period, it was proposed that a Multi Purpose Module (MPM) called Enterprise should be docked to Zarya, and later the Nauka Multipurpose Laboratory Module (MLM) was proposed to be located there as well, but the Enterprise module has since been cancelled and the Nauka MLM was docked to Zvezdas nadir port instead.

Purpose 
Rassvet was designed as a solution to two problems facing the ISS partners:
 NASA was under contract to carry the MLM outfitting equipment into space.
 The overlapping missions of the Progress, Soyuz, and ATV spacecraft highlighted the need to have four Russian docking ports available on the ISS. The cancellation of both Russian Research Modules meant that the ISS would be left with just three such docking ports after the installation of the Permanent Multipurpose Module in 2011, which made the nadir port of Zarya unusable.

Rassvet solved both of these issues. NASA did not need to add another payload flight to accommodate the MLM outfitting equipment, as it could attach the hardware to the exterior of MRM-1. The ISS now had four docking ports available on the Russian segment: the aft port of Zvezda, the port of Pirs, later MLM (on the nadir port of Zvezda), the port of MRM-2 (on the zenith port of Zvezda), and the port on MRM-1 (on the nadir port of Zarya). Russia's cancellation of the Research Module thus came to be of less consequence for the ISS program as a whole.

Design and construction 

The module was designed and built by S.P. Korolev Rocket and Space Corporation Energia, from the already-made pressurized hull of the mock-up for dynamic tests of the cancelled Science Power Platform.

On 17 December 2009, an Antonov An-124 carrying the Rassvet Module and ground process equipment arrived at the Kennedy Space Center in Florida. Upon unloading, the equipment was delivered to a prelaunch processing facility run by the Astrotech. Energia specialists and technicians continued their work on the processing of the Rassvet module at the facility, completing stand-alone electrical tests and leak tests of the module and the airlock. They also prepared the airlock and the radiative heat exchanger for installation onto Rassvet. The module was moved to NASA's Space Station Processing Facility on 2 April 2010. After completing the final touches, it was placed into the shuttle payload transporter on 5 April 2010. The payload canister containing the Rassvet Module arrived at LC-39A on 15 April 2010.

Engineers at Launch Pad 39A preparing Space Shuttle Atlantis had noticed paint peeling from the MRM-1 module. Although the problem was declared to have no impact on the operation of Rassvet, it posed a potential threat of releasing debris on orbit.

Visited spacecraft 
Rassvet was connected to nadir port of Zarya on 18 May 2010.

Gallery

See also 

 Poisk (ISS module)
 Pirs (ISS module)

References

External links 
 http://space.skyrocket.de/doc_sdat/dsm.htm
 http://www.russianspaceweb.com/iss_enterprise.html
 Rassvet at Astrotech looking NW
 Rassvet at Astrotech looking north
 Rassvet at Astrotech from above
 Rassvet at Astrotech looking SE

Russian components of the International Space Station
Spacecraft launched in 2010
2010 in Russia